Ivan Slamnig (24 June 1930 – 3 July 2001) was a Croatian poet, novelist, literary theorist and translator.

Slamnig was born in Metković. He graduated from the University of Zagreb Faculty of Humanities and Social Sciences in 1955 and later taught at its Department of Comparative Literature. His poem Barbara, set to music by Zvonko Špišić, was a hit in 1975.

Slamnig was a full member of the Croatian Academy of Sciences and Arts since 1992.

References

Sources

 Ivan Slamnig 
 Preminuli članovi 
 Utjeha kaosa 
 Melankolično evanđelje po Ivanu 
Helena Peričić, 'Strana književnost i nacionalna književna tradicija (O dvjema Slamnigovim raspravama u časopisu Međutim)', Književna revija (Dani Ivana Slamniga, Osijek, 26.-29. listopada 2000.), ur. Branka Ban et al., Osijek, Matica hrvatska - Osijek, 1–2, 2001., 65–67.
Helena Peričić, 'Stvarno/nestvarno u radio-dramama Ivana Slamniga', OS lamnigu - drugi, zbornik izabranih radova triju saziva međunarodnoga znanstvenog skkupa Modernitet druge polovice dvadesetoga stoljeća, Ivan Slamnig - Boro Pavlović, postmodernitet, Dani Ivana Slamniga (Osijek, studenog 2002., Osijek - Budimpešta, prosinca 2003.-siječnja 2004, Poznan, listopada 2005.), 2006., Osijek/Poznan, Filozofski fakultet Osijek, Uniwersytet im Adama Mickiewicza w Poznaniu, 2006., 227–234.
 Helena Peričić, 'Između stvaralačkog egzila i poticaja domaće književne tradicije (Slamnig, Šoljan, Paljetak)', in: Dani hvarskog kazališta (Prostor i granice hrvatske književnosti i kazališta), ed. by N. Batušić et al., Zagreb-Split, HAZU-Književni krug, 32, 2006, 346–359.
 Helena Peričić, 'Multiculturalism and the Return to Tradition. Elements of the Literatures in English in the Works of Some Postmodern Croatian Playwrights: Slamnig - Šoljan - Paljetak', Identities in Transition in the English-Speaking World, ed. by Nicoletta Vasta et al., Udine, Forum, 2011, 251–260.

External links
 Translated works by Ivan Slamnig

1930 births
2001 deaths
Croatian male poets
Croatian novelists
Male novelists
Members of the Croatian Academy of Sciences and Arts
Faculty of Humanities and Social Sciences, University of Zagreb alumni
Academic staff of the University of Zagreb
People from Metković
Burials at Mirogoj Cemetery
Vladimir Nazor Award winners
20th-century Croatian poets
20th-century novelists
20th-century male writers